Han Jin (/han ʤɪn/; born October 15, 1988) is co-founder, CEO, and product architect of Lucid VR Inc. (Lucid), a Santa Clara, California-based startup.

Education and career 
Jin was born in China and grew up in Germany. He attended the University of California Berkeley as a graduate student, then worked at flash memory company SanDisk. While at SanDisk he applied for an O-1 visa, after which he left SanDisk to start Lucid.

Lucid VR 
Jin co-founded Lucid in January 2015 with the company's chief technical officer, Adam Rowell. The company's flagship product was a high definition camera, the LucidCam.

Recognition 
In 2017, Jin was on the cover of the May issue of Inc. as part of the magazine's “30 Under 30” feature. Forbes listed Jin as one of the Forbes 30 Under 30 in consumer technology in November 2017. In 2018, Jin was awarded the gold trophy in the Stevie Awards for Entrepreneur of the Year - Computer Software - Up to 500 Employees.

References 

1988 births
University of California, Berkeley alumni
Living people